The Church of St Francis de Sales is a Roman Catholic church in Hampton Hill, in the London Borough of Richmond upon Thames. It is the parish church for the parish (Catholic Church) of Hampton Hill and Upper Teddington in the Upper Thames Deanery of the Diocese of Westminster. 

The parish was formed in 1920 and the original church completed in 1928. The current church, constructed in 1966, was designed by Burles, Newton & Partners, who also completed the nave at St Aidan's Roman Catholic Church, Coulsdon in the London Borough of Croydon. It was consecrated on 18 December 1976.

The parsish priest is Father Wojciech Stachyra of the Society of Christ. Mass is held every morning and also on Saturday and Sunday evenings.

References

External links

1920 establishments in England
20th-century Roman Catholic church buildings in the United Kingdom
Churches in the Roman Catholic Diocese of Westminster
Religious organizations established in 1920
Roman Catholic churches completed in 1966
Roman Catholic churches in the London Borough of Richmond upon Thames